Naivasha Airport is an airport in Naivasha, Kenya.

Location

The geographic coordinates of this airport are:0° 47' 6.00"S, 36° 26' 2.00"E (Latitude:-0.785000; Longitude:36.433890).

Overview
Naivasha Airport is a small civilian airport, serving the town of Naivasha and surrounding communities.

Airlines and destinations

See also
 Kenya Airports Authority
 Kenya Civil Aviation Authority
 List of airports in Kenya

References

External links
 Location of Naivasha Airport At Google Maps
  Website of Kenya Airports Authority
 List of Airports In Kenya

Airports in Kenya
Airports in Rift Valley Province
Nakuru County